Jessica Rose Meuse (born October 19, 1990), also known as Jess Meuse, is an American singer-songwriter from Slapout, Alabama. After spending several years as an unsigned musician, she finished in fourth place on the thirteenth season of American Idol. Her debut album, What's So Hard About Bein' a Man, was self-released in 2011, three years before she gained national exposure on reality television. While competing on American Idol, she became the first person in the history of the series to perform an original song during the finals. Her second album, Halfhearted, was released on August 3, 2018, through Warrior Records.

Early life and education
Meuse was born in Round Rock, Texas, on October 19, 1990, to Charles Edward and Sheila Arlene (Strobel) Meuse. Her mother's government job led to the family moving several times when Meuse was a child. As a way to be more outgoing as a pre-teen, she recorded CDs and gave them to friends. While living in Zephyrhills, Florida in 2002, she attended St. Anthony Catholic School in nearby San Antonio, Florida. It was there, at the school's talent show, that she acknowledges performing publicly for the first time. When she was in the seventh grade, she moved to Slapout, Alabama, where she joined the Montgomery Youth Orchestra, eventually becoming principal second violin. She also played shows of her own at various festivals, fundraisers, schools, and public events. In addition to the violin, she plays both guitar and piano.

She attended Auburn University at Montgomery, where she majored in liberal arts.

Musical influences
Meuse states she is, "influenced by virtually every genre of music." More specifically though, she has called her style "a blend of southern rock with alternative and rock n’ roll." Mary Colurso of AL.com has described it as "rock...infused with country and metal." Meuse's musical influences include Coldplay, Miranda Lambert, Creedence Clearwater Revival, Stevie Nicks, Death Cab for Cutie, Bruno Mars, and Shinedown.

Music career

Career beginnings and What's So Hard About Bein' a Man (2008–2014)
Meuse began writing music at age eighteen. Her first song was called "What's So Hard About Bein' a Man". She went on to self-release a CD by the same name in 2011 and had already written around sixty original songs by the time of her American Idol audition.

In October 2010, Meuse won the Stars of Alabama Artist Showcase, a statewide music competition that was judged by professionals from Montgomery, Atlanta and Nashville. In October 2013, Meuse was featured by the Alabama Media Group in the Birmingham Sessions, an online showcase for musicians around the Birmingham, Alabama area. She auditioned for The Voice before her American Idol run, but did not pass the initial blind audition.

American Idol (2014)

While participating as a musical act in Vans Warped Tour, Meuse was encouraged by friends to audition for the thirteenth season of American Idol in Atlanta, Georgia. She performed an original song called "Blue-Eyed Lie" and was accepted by all three judges. For her final Hollywood week performance, Meuse chose another original song called "Done." The judges were initially undecided between putting Meuse or Jesse Roach through to the top 30. To decide, the judges had Meuse and Roach do an impromptu sing-off. Meuse's performance of "Simple Man" (by Lynyrd Skynyrd) advanced her to the Top 30.

All of the contestants reprised their audition songs for top 8-week, giving Meuse the opportunity to sing "Blue Eyed Lie" again. This made her the first contestant in the history of American Idol to sing an original song during the finals. For top 4-week, Meuse was originally going to sing another original song, called "The Hell You Put Me Through" – all of the contestants were going to sing originals for one of their performances that week. However, the producers changed their minds late in the week and gave the contestants a short amount of time to choose a replacement from a very limited list of songs. Meuse chose Pinks's "So What."

Meuse's fan base is known as "The Meuse Mafia." She has jokingly referred to her experience on the show as being like the Hunger Games, and in one episode, she braided her hair in the same style as Katniss Everdeen. Several reviewers and journalists felt that Meuse was unfairly treated by the show, such as Annie Barrett, who wrote for TVLine that the judges were "just blatantly not rooting for her at all. Lyndsey Parker of Yahoo! Music concurred, writing that "it seemed like the judges and producers were doing their best" to get Meuse eliminated from the competition. Parker further wrote that Meuse received "harsh critique" for praise-worthy performances, even as the judges overlooked significant flaws in other contestants. BuddyTV writer Jeff Dodge opined that Meuse was being held to an unfair "double standard." Writing for TV Guide, Liz Raftery assessed fan opinion as being "frustrat[ed]" with the judges, over their poor treatment of Meuse.

Meuse was never among the "Bottom 3", until top 7-week, when the "Bottom 2" was composed of her and the eliminated contestant, Dexter Roberts. The following week, Meuse was again in the "Bottom 2", but C.J. Harris was eliminated. There was no bottom 2 for top 5-week. The contestants were offered a choice – if they agreed unanimously, that week's results would be discarded and all five of them would move on to perform again. Two of them would then be eliminated the following week. Although Meuse voted in favor of this idea, the vote was not unanimous, and Sam Woolf was eliminated. Meuse herself was eliminated the following week. She came in fourth place and reprised "Blue Eyed Lie" as her exit song.

"Blue-Eyed Lie"
During her time on American Idol, Meuse was known for her original song "Blue-Eyed Lie". She had already gained positive attention for the song in Alabama a year earlier after performing it for an artist showcase held by the Alabama Media Group. At that time, Mary Colurso of AL.com commented on the song, calling it "confident and gritty". "Blue-Eyed Lie" was further lauded by the press after Meuse performed it on American Idol. Jennifer Still of Digital Spy wrote that the song "absolutely rocks – literally and figuratively. It sounds like a song you could hear on the radio tomorrow", Lyndsey Parker of Yahoo! Music called Meuse's performance of the song "stellar", and Brian Mansfield of USA Today praised the song's "'60s garage-rock" sound. Michael Slezak of TVLine, who praised the song for its gritty vocals and "stinging lyrics", went on to rank Meuse's live performance of "Blue-Eyed Lie" as one of the thirty greatest moments in the history of American Idol.

Post-Idol and Halfhearted (2014–present)
Meuse returned to the American Idol stage for the season 13 finale, where she performed with Jennifer Nettles. She then performed in the American Idol summer tour, which began on June 24, 2014, and went through August 23. Following the tour, Meuse went back to performing shows mostly in Alabama and Georgia, although she also played occasionally in California and Tennessee. In early 2015, she told The Hollywood Reporter that she had intentions of moving to Los Angeles. Her debut single, "Done," was released independently on April 21, 2015, and her second single, "Rio Grande", was released on January 5, 2016.

Although Meuse expressed on Twitter in late 2016 that she considered Los Angeles to be her "second home", she continued to reside primarily in Slapout until the end of that year, when she moved to Houston, Texas for a position with the Lone Survivor Foundation. Around that same time, she announced that she had an EP in production. Within a few months, the EP had been expanded into a full album. Titled Halfhearted, it was released through Warrior Records on August 3, 2018, as Meuse's first post-Idol album. All of the songs on Halfhearted were written by Meuse. The album reached the iTunes Top Ten Country Albums. 

Four songs from Halfhearted were released as singles leading up to the album's release: "Love Her Better" on June 1; "High" on June 15; "California Dream" on June 29; and "Thank God It Didn't Work" on July 13. "Thank God It Didn't Work" was released to country radio, and Taste of Country praised the song, calling it, "a full-throated vocal showcase that demands your attention." Meuse departed from Warrior Records in 2019. Among the tracks on Halfhearted is "Without You", a duet between Meuse and Bo Bice. In June 2020, Fred Bronson of Billboard praised "Without You" as an "overlooked gem".

Personal life
Meuse has called herself a "very spiritual person" and has said that she is driven by her faith. She has over eight tattoos and designed at least seven of them herself. She has two on her right arm – one of a phoenix and one of a dove surrounded by three stars. She has said that these represent spiritual rebirth and the Holy Trinity. On her left arm, she has a tattoo of the word "Faith". After she and Jena Irene Asciutto participated in American Idols thirteenth season together, they got matching tattoos of the Roman numeral XIII.

Meuse loves animals and has many pets that were rescued from shelters, as well as several that she found abandoned.

Meuse's mother, Sheila, worked as the assistant director of the Central Alabama Veterans Health Care System, where in 2014, she became a whistleblower exposing mismanagement in the VA. Her efforts, and the VA's subsequent retaliation against her, have been detailed by the ''Montgomery Advertiser and NPR.

Discography

Albums

Singles

American Idol digital singles

References

External links
 

1990 births
American Idol participants
Living people
21st-century American singers
Auburn University at Montgomery alumni
People from Zephyrhills, Florida
Singers from Florida
People from Round Rock, Texas
Singers from Texas
People from Elmore County, Alabama
Singers from Alabama
21st-century American women singers